Abd Ar-Rahman ibn Sakhr, also known as Abu Hurayra (–681) was one of the companions of Islamic prophet Muhammad and, according to Sunni Islam, the most prolific narrator of hadith.

He was known by the kunyah Abu Hurayrah "Father of a Kitten", in reference to his attachment to cats, and he was a member of Suffah. Later during the caliphate era, Abu Hurairah served as an ‘Ālim, governor, soldier, and Hadith auditor.

Abu Hurairah was acknowledged by Muslim scholars for his extraordinary photographic memory which allowed him to memorize massive numbers of over 5,000 hadiths which later produced more than 500,000 chain narrations, or Isnad which make Abu Hurairah an exemplar role model for Hadith studies scholars.

Life

Ancestry 
Abu Hurairah's personal name (ism) is unknown, and so is his father's. The most popular opinion, voiced by Al-Dhahabi and Ibn Hajar al-Asqalani, is that it was 'Abd al-Raḥmān ibn Ṣakhr. According to Al-Dhahabi, Abu Hurairah hailed from the prominent Banu Daws clan of the Arab tribe of Zahran, and was born in the region of Al-Bahah. Ibn Hajar al-Asqalani traced the lineage of the Banu Daws to Azd, a Nabatean ancestor of the southern Arabs, through Zahran. Al-Qalqashandi reported the Zahran as a descendant of Khalid ibn Nasr, while Ibn Hazm reported Zahran was a descendant of Malik ibn Nasr, a Qahtanite. Hadith narrations record Muhammad as having a favorable view of the Banu Daws, who viewed them on par with his tribe, the Quraysh, the Ansar of Medina, and Banu Thaqif.

Conversion to Islam and life in Medina 
Abu Hurairah embraced Islam through Tufayl ibn 'Amr, the chieftain of his tribe. Tufayl had returned to his village after meeting Muhammad in Mecca and converting to Islam in its early years. Abu Hurairah was one of the first to accept Islam, unlike the majority of Tufayl's tribesmen who embraced Islam later. Abu Hurairah accompanied Tufayl to Mecca to meet Muhammad who renamed him Abdurrahman. It was said that he found a stray kitten, so he took it in his sleeve, which is the reason he was named Abu Hurairah (father of the kitten).

After the hijrah (migration to Medina), Abu Hurairah became one of the inhabitants of the Suffah. Abu Hurairah stuck closely to Muhammad, and went on expeditions and journeys with him. Abu Hurairah was recorded as having participated in the Expedition of Dhat al-Riqa, which took place in Najd in the year 4 AH or 5 AH. The consensus of Muslim scholars considers Abu Hurairah's military career as having begun after the Battle of Khaybar, after which he was present in the Battle of Mu'tah, during the Conquest of Mecca, at Hunayn, and in the Expedition of Tabuk. Later, Abu Hurairah were sent as a muezzin to al-Ala al-Hadhrami in Bahrayn.

Abu Hurairah was father-in-law of the prominent tabi' Said ibn al-Musayyib (d. 715), who confessed that he had married Abu Hurairah's daughter in order to get closer with her father and learn the hadith he possessed. Hammam ibn Munabbih (d. 748), another prominent tabi''' and disciple of Abu Hurairah compiled the hadith narrated to him by Abu Hurairah in his hadith collection Sahifah Hammam ibn Munabbih, one of the earliest hadith collections in history. There is little mention of the family of Abu Huraira, but it is known that he had a wife named Basra bint Ghazwan.

 After Muhammad, later years and death 
According to Ahmad ibn Hanbal, after the death of Muhammad, Abu Hurairah participated in the Ridda Wars under the first Rashidun caliph, Abu Bakr. After Abu Bakr's death, during Umar's reign, Abu Hurairah actively participated in the Muslim conquest of Persia. Later, he became governor of Bahrayn. During this time, Abu Hurairah is noted to have become wealthy, amassing close to 10,000 gold dinars through breeding horses and spoils of war, which he brought to Medina. This raised Umar's suspicion, who accused him of corruption. Abu Hurairah was later found innocent and Umar asked him again to govern Bahrayn once again, an offer he turned down. After leaving the governorship, Abu Hurairah returned to Medina and worked as a qadi (judge), issuing fatāwā ( fatwa). Abu Hurairah was one of the defenders of the third Rashidun caliph, Uthman, during his assassination. Abu Hurairah continued to work as mufti after Uthman's death. In the early Umayyad era, Abu Hurairah was tasked with assessing the authenticity of the hadith circulated within the caliphate.
Abu Hurairah died in the year 681 (59 AH) at the age of 78 and was buried at al-Baqi'. His funeral prayer was led by Al-Walid ibn Utba, who was the governor of Medina, and was attended by Abd Allah ibn Umar and Abu Sa'id al Khudri. Al-Walid wrote to Mu'awiya I about his death, who made a concession of 10,000 dirhams to Abu Hurairah's heirs and commanded Al-Walid to take care of them. In 1274 (673 AH) the Mausoleum of Abu Hurairah was constructed in Yibna, at the order of the Mamluk Sultan Baibars. The mausoleum has been described as "one of the finest domed mausoleums in Palestine."Petersen, 2001, p. 313 Following the 1948 Arab–Israeli War, the mausoleum was designated a shrine for Jews dedicated to Gamaliel II by the Israeli government, although neither Abu Hurairah nor Gamaliel II are likely to have been buried in the tomb.

 Legacy and influence 
The hadith reported by Abu Hurairah are diverse, being used by Islamic scholars specializing in hadith, 'aqīdah, fiqh (Islamic jurisprudence), ijtihād, tafsīr (Quranic exegesis), and Islamic eschatology.

In his Kitab al-Iman, a book on 'aqīdah, Ibn Taymiyyah (d. 1328) uses hadith narrations from Abu Hurairah to study tawḥīd. Ibn Kathir uses Abu Hurairah's narrations in Al-Nihāyah fī al-Fitan wa al-Malaḥim, a work on Islamic eschatology. References to Abu Hurairah's narrations can be found in Al-Tabari's Tafsir al-Tabari, Ibn Kathir's Tafsir Ibn Kathir, Al-Mahalli and al-Suyuti's collaborative Tafsir al-Jalalayn, and Al-Qurtubi's Tafsir al-Qurtubi, all of which are works of tafsīr, or Quranic exegesis. They also refer to Abu Hurairah's ijtihād and the resulting fatāwā as their resources.

Abu Hurairah was among the few companions of Muhammad who issued jurisprudential rulings or fatāwā ( fatwa), and he was personally requested by his contemporary companion Ibn Abbas to do so. As the Sunni madhahib ( madhhab, schools of jurisprudence) were structurally based on the rulings or narrations from companions of Muhammad, the ruling jurisprudence for the four main Sunni madhahib heavily relied on Abu Hurairah's fatāwā and his numerous narrations. Taqi al-Din al-Subki compiled the fatāwā of Abu Hurairah in his book, Fatawa Abu Hurairah. Abu Hurairah was one of the six prominent companions of Muhammad involved in jurisprudential rulings during the Rashidun era, the others being Ali, Sa'd ibn Abi Waqqas, Abu Darda, Saʽid al-Khudri, and Abu Shafiah. Abd al-Rahman Jaziri, a professor at Al-Azhar University, has concluded that on certain issues, the four madhahib reached ijmā' (consensus) on Abu Hurairah's ruling.

The four major Sunni madhahib, have all used hadith narrated by Abu Hurairah in major jurisprudential decisions. Muwatta Imam Malik, the hadith collection of the founder of the Maliki madhhab, Malik ibn Anas, contains various hadiths narrated by Abu Hurairah wherein they form the basis for jurisprudential rulings. Bulugh al-Maram, a hadith collection by Ibn Hajar al-Asqalani pertaining to the Shafi'i madhhab also contains many hadith narrated by Abu Hurairah. Al-Nawawi's Al-Arba'ūn an-Nawawiyyah also contain narrations from Abu Hurairah. According to Muhammad ibn al-Uthaymeen in his commentary of Al-Nawawi's Riyāḍ as-Ṣaliḥīn, Abu Hurairah's ijtihad formed the basis for Al-Nawawi's rulings of wudu.

 Hadith 
Abu Hurairah is credited with narrating at least 5,374 hadith. Abu Hurairah continued collecting hadith after the death of Muhammad from Abu Bakr, Umar, Aisha, Fadl ibn Abbas, Usama ibn Zayd, Ubayy ibn Ka'b, and Ka'b al-Ahbar. It is said by Abu Hurairah himself the only one who surpassed him regarding hadith were Abd Allah ibn Amr ibn al-As, another companion who serve as writer assistant of Muhammad and author of "Al-Sahifah al-Sadiqah", the first Hadith book in history. However, according to his own admission, Abu Hurairah said that Abd Allah ibn Amr ibn al-As possessed a greater number of narrations than himself, since Abd Allah diligently wrote every hadith he heard, while Abu Hurairah relied on his extraordinary memory. 

Muhammad Sa'id Mursi recorded around 800 companions of Muhammad and tabi'un who learnt hadith from Abu Hurairah. According to the records from Ibn Hajar and ad-Dhahabi, Abu Hurairah fellow Sahabah and Tabi'un who narrated hadiths from him were Abd Allah ibn Umar ibn al-Khattab, Ibn Abbas, Jabir ibn Abd Allah, Anas ibn Malik, Said ibn al-Musayyib, Urwah ibn Zubayr, Amr ibn Dinar, Ibn Sirin, Ata ibn Abi Rabah, Isa ibn Talha al-Taymi, Hammam ibn Munabbih, Hasan al-Basri, Tawus ibn Kaysan, Qasim ibn Muhammad ibn Abi Bakr, among others. 

 Abu Hurairah's narrative chains 
According to Ali Ahmad as-Salus, Abu Hurairah possessed more asnād ( sanad) than Ibn Abbas, Aisha, Abd Allah ibn Umar, and Abdullah ibn Masud. According to Al-Dhahabi, the healthiest and most authentic asnād of narrators beginning at Abu Hurairah were:
 Abu Hurairah → Ibn Sirin → Ayyub al-Sakhtiani
 Abu Hurairah → Ibn Sirin → Abd Allah ibn Awn
 Abu Hurairah → Abdul Rahman bin Hormuz → Abdullah ibn Dhakwan
 Abu Hurairah → Said ibn al-Musayyib → Ibn Shihab al-Zuhri

According to Al-Khatib al-Baghdadi, Ali ibn al-Madini (d. 849) considered the most authentic chain that begin with Abu Hurairah as being Abu Hurairah → Ibn Sirin → Ayyub al-Sakhtiani → Hammad ibn Zaid. 

According to Ahmad Muhammad Shakir (d. 1958), a hadith scholar from Al-Azhar University, the most authentic asnād that came from Abu Hurayrah were:
 Abu Hurairah → Said ibn al-Musayyib → Ibn Shihab al-Zuhri → Malik ibn Anas
 Abu Hurairah → Said ibn al-Musayyib → Ibn Shihab al-Zuhri → Ma'mar ibn Rashid
 Abu Hurairah → Said ibn al-Musayyib → Ibn Shihab al-Zuhri → Sufyan ibn ʽUyaynah
 Abu Hurairah → Ibn Sirin → Ayyub al-Sakhtiani → Hammad ibn Zaid
 Abu Hurairah → Ubaidah ibn Sufyan al Hadhrami → Ismail ibn Al-Hakim
 Abu Hurairah → Hammam ibn Munabbih →  Ma'mar ibn Rashid
According to Al-Albani in his book, Silsalat al-Hadith ad-Da'ifah, the madhhab of Abu Hurairah was taken as a guideline for hadith scholars to evaluate the validity of a hadith.

 Criticism 
Shaykh Mahmud Abu Rayyah (d.1970), the youngest brother of Hassan al-Banna and also the author of Aḍwā alā al-sunna al-Muhammadiyya (Illuminations on the Sunnah of Muḥammad). One of the works he produced was on raising doubts about the reliability of Abu Hurarirah.Modern Muslim Objections to Ṣaḥīḥ al-Bukhārī,Studia Islamica 117 (2022),Nebil Husayn. Retrieved June 13,2020

According to Yasin Jibouri, several Shia scholars such as Ja'far al-Iskafi regarded Abu Hurayra as telling lies. Same goes with Abu Rayyah, independent writer from Egypt who quoted medieval Shia source in his report regarding Abu Hurairah. Certain Shia writers are known for doubting his authority as a narrator. As Abdullah Saeed points out the writing from Abu Rayyah that Caliph Umar bin Khattab is recorded to repeatedly threaten Abu Hurayrah, noted at the time as a blatant self-promoter, with serious consequences due to his frequent misquote of the Prophet's words.

However, researchers have found that the Sunni scholarly community unanimously regarded Abu Hurairah as trustworthy both classical medieval and modern contemporaries, and they though the allegation of the hadith falsification by Abu Hurairah were coming solely from Shia traditions, which not found in Kutub al-Sittah and other major Hadith works, as medieval scholars such as Dhahabi said that the criticism towards Abu Hurairah are not accepted even during the early times of Islam for several reasons, including because those who criticize Abu Hurairah themselves are known as Mudallis (defected or untrustworthy narrators) according to Jarh wa Ta'dil (biographical evaluation study) and Asbab wurud (chronological study of Hadith). Which generally agreed by later era counterparts, which further adds that Jarh wa Ta'dil rulings only valid to evaluate Tabi'un or generations above them, while Sahabah generation are free and exempt from Jarh wa Ta'dil and accepted without exception, as long they are confirmed and identified by chroniclers as Sahabah.

Safia Aoude and Ali al-Tamimi also highlighted, the narration of Umar threatening Abu Hurairaha, which quoted by Abdullah Saeed, were also came solely from a writer which influenced by Abu Rayyah, Particularly from anonymous writer who has pen name "O. Hashem" who write his criticism towards Abu Hurairah in his book, Saqifah. Several Sunni thinkers and scholars such as has been Mustafa al-Siba'i, Shuaib Al Arna'ut, along with director of Maktabah al-Haram al-Makki ash-Shariff''(Library of the Great Mosque of Mecca) Abdur-Rahman al-Mu'allimee al-Yamani, has criticized the sources which O. Hashem quoted only using falsified and inauthentic hadith according to standard of Bukhari, Sahih Muslim, Ibn Hajar al-Asqalani, and Al-Dhahabi criterion of biography evaluation, while also questioning O. Hashim scholarly credibility as they though O. Hashem were driven by Shiite biased view on his critics. While Muhammad ibn al-Uthaymeen dismissing such criticism towards Abu Hurairah which came from Shia traditions as he said they are simply "a tradition of error collection".

According to Burhanuddin from Indonesia's Ministry of Religious Affairs, the scholars observation from Siba'i, Abdul Mun'im Shalih Al-'Ali, Dhiya'urrahman Al A'Dzamy, Muhammad Abu Syahbah, Shalahuddin Maqbul Ahmad, and Abdullah ibn Abdil Aziz An-Nashir, has found out the reason Abu Rayyah, has such inorganized method in his writing were because the background of Abu Rayyah though not came from proper academic learning, instead he was just influenced by the writings of Goldziher. 
	
Badri Khairuman from Kalijaga Islamic University, on the other side, has pointed out that Abu Rayyah critic towards Abu Hurairah were flawed according to the main principles of Biographical evaluation traditions and accusing Abu Rayyah relying on single source of 12th AD twelver Shia scholar, Allamah Al-Hilli. Furthermore, the case of accusation of Abu Hurairah were nullified according to Badri, as Badri reasons it is impossible if Umar does not trust Abu Hurairah, while on the fact Umar were nominating Abu Hurairah twice as governor of Bahrayn and entrusting him to produce Fatwa in eastern Arabia, while on the last years of Umar, the caliph appoint Abu Hurairah as judge in Medina, the citadel of caliphate. Badri concludes his thesis that the phenomena of Abu Rayyah writing came from the elementary and very small Abu Rayyah knowledge regarding the structural Hadith studies with proper methodology. While scholar, Abdur-Rahman al-Mu'allimee al-Yamani gave short remarks that Abu Rayyah assessment towards Abu Hurairah came from biased view, not proper methodology of Hadith study.

See also

 
List of battles of Muhammad

Notes and references

Notes

References

Bibliography 
 
 

603 births
681 deaths
Sunni imams
Sahabah hadith narrators
Rashidun governors of Bahrain
Burials at Jannat al-Baqī
People of the Muslim conquest of Persia
Hadith scholars
7th-century jurists